Platypodiella spectabilis, known as the gaudy clown crab, or simply the clown crab is a small species of crab in the family Xanthidae that is native to the Gulf of Mexico.

Description 
P. spectabilis is relatively small, with a carapace of up to 3 cm in width. The shell is typically bright orange, with bilaterally symmetrical patches of cream with blue rims and dots. This brilliant appearance leads to the crab's common name.

Distribution and habitat 
This species inhabits coral reefs in the Gulf of Mexico, typically on or near zoanthids and sponges. They can be found from around 0.5 - 50m.

Human uses 
Due to its small size, P. spectabilis is of no use to humans as a source of food. It is instead favoured in the pet trade as an aquarium pet, mostly for its striking appearance and easy husbandry.

References 

"Platypodiella spectabilis (Herbst, 1794)". World Register of Marine Species. http://www.marinespecies.org/aphia.php?p=taxdetails&id=422143
https://reefguide.org/keys/platypodiellaspectabilis.html
http://species-identification.org/species.php?species_group=zsao&id=3841

External links
 

Xanthoidea
Crustaceans described in 1794